Songjeong Park station is a station of Gwangju Metro Line 1 in Songjeong-dong, Gwangsan District, Gwangju, South Korea. It serves as a transit station using local buses for citizens living in residential areas such as Hanam, Unnam, and Suwan. There is a subway literature museum at this station.

Station layout

External links
  Cyber station information from Gwangju Metropolitan Rapid Transit Corporation
  Cyber station information from Gwangju Metropolitan Rapid Transit Corporation

Gwangju Metro stations
Gwangsan District
Railway stations opened in 2008